Fita Benkhoff (1 November 1901 – 26 October 1967) was a German actress.

Life
Benkhoff was born in 1901. In the 1920s the actress Louise Dumont separated from her husband. Dumont was attached to a number of young actresses including Benkhoff, Hanni Hoessrich and Luise Rainer. It has been presumed that Dumont was bisexual. Benkhoff appeared in more than 100 films between 1933 and 1967.

Selected filmography

 Mother and Child (1934) - Frau Hellinger
 Ein Mädel wirbelt durch die Welt (1934) - Fräulein Pape
 Gold (1934) - (uncredited)
 Der Meisterboxer (1934) - Amalie Wipperling, Inhaberin eines kleinen Modegeschäftes
 Charley's Aunt (1934) - Mary Fin
 Trouble with Jolanthe (1934) - Erna Klüfkorn, seine Braut
 What Am I Without You (1934) - Frau Winkler
 Heinz in the Moon (1934) - Madame Pythia
 Schwarzer Jäger Johanna (1934) - Philine Melchior
 Alte Kameraden (1934) - Liselotte Klarerdag
 The Legacy of Pretoria (1934) - Lilly Clausen
 The Two Seals (1934) - Thekla
 Amphitryon (1935) - Andria
 Die Werft zum Grauen Hecht (1935) - Mila Schellhase
 The Valley of Love (1935) - Theres
 Liebeslied (1935) - Angelina
 Hangmen, Women and Soldiers (1935) - Die Kesse
 Der schüchterne Casanova (1936) - Dody Hartwig, Verkäuferin
 Street Music (1936) - Hilde Neumann - eine junge Witwe
 Boccaccio (1936) - Bianca, seine Frau
 Moral (1936) - Ernina Lapomme
 Dinner Is Served (1936) - Henrietta - seine Frau
 Die un-erhörte Frau (1936) - Lisa Brandt - seine Frau
 When Women Keep Silent (1937) - Lilo - seine Frau
 Capers (1937) - Peggy MacFarland
 Manege (1937) - Miß Nelson
 Petermann ist dagegen (1938) - Hanne Krüger - Leiterin der Betriebskantine
 Stimme des Blutes (1938)
 The Marriage Swindler (1938) - Frau Lindemann
 Schüsse in Kabine 7 (1938) - Daisy Lennox
 Diskretion - Ehrensache (1938) - Lilian
 All Lies (1938) - Elisabeth
 Spaßvögel (1939) - Katharina Eberhorn
 It's a Wonderful World (1939)
 Wibbel the Tailor (1939) - Fin, seine Frau
 Die goldene Maske (1939) - Nora
 Opera Ball (1939) - Stubenmädchen Hanni
 Ihr Privatsekretär (1940) - Frau Helene Kiepergass
 Casanova heiratet (1940) - Johanna 'Joe' Brinkmann
 Was wird hier gespielt? (1940)
 The Girl from Barnhelm (1940) - Franziska
 What Does Brigitte Want? (1941) - Beate Forbach
 Frau Luna (1941) - Frau Elisabeth Gerlack
 in Immer nur Du (1941) - Isolde Brummel
 So ein Früchtchen (1942) - Ria Corsini
 Meine Freundin Josefine (1942) - Bianka Terry
 Johann (1943) - Marie Pietschmann
 I Need You (1944) - Hedi Scholz
 Ich habe von dir geträumt (1944) - Maria Dahlberg
 Der Scheiterhaufen (1945)
 Everything Will Be Better in the Morning (1948) - Peggy Hansen, Schauspielerin
 The Time with You (1948) - Frau Beckel
 Trouble Backstairs (1949) - Irma Schulze
 The Beaver Coat (1949) - Auguste Wolff
 Friday the Thirteenth (1949) - Vilma Reckennagel
 Kein Engel ist so rein (1950) - Philine
 Melody of Fate (1950)
 Taxi-Kitty (1950) - Elvira Rembrandt
 Das gestohlene Jahr (1951) - Anna von Boehlen
 The Midnight Venus (1951) - Madame Lavable
 Hilfe, ich bin unsichtbar (1951) - Yvonne
 Die Frauen des Herrn S. (1951) - Stabila
 Durch dick und dünn (1951) - Else Müller
 In München steht ein Hofbräuhaus (1951) - Hermine Kackelmann
 The Thief of Bagdad (1952) - Suleika
 Pension Schöller (1952) - Josefine Krüger, Schriftstellerin
 Dancing Stars (1952) - Nicolle Ferrar
 When the Heath Dreams at Night (1952) - Hermine Knauer
 We'll Talk About Love Later (1953) - Margot Hollmann
 The Singing Hotel (1953) - Dr. Toni Bruscher
 Fanfare of Marriage (1953) - Daisy van Roy
 Must We Get Divorced? (1953) - Elisabeth Lindpaintner
 The Abduction of the Sabine Women (1956) - Frau Striese
 The Telephone Operator (1954) - Tante Bruni
 Maxie (1954) - Irene, beider Freundin
 On the Reeperbahn at Half Past Midnight (1954) - Luise
 The Captain and His Hero (1954) - Frau Kellermann
 Der Himmel ist nie ausverkauft (1955)
 Wenn der Vater mit dem Sohne (1955) - Frl. Biermann
 A Heart Full of Music (1955) - Ellinor Patton
 Three Girls from the Rhine (1955) - Therese Hübner
 Dany, bitte schreiben Sie (1956) - Madame Georgette
 The First Day of Spring (1956) - Käthe
 Opera Ball (1956) - Hermine, seine Frau
 If We All Were Angels (1956) - Selma
 The Beggar Student (1956) - Gräfin Palmatica
 Zwei Herzen voller Seligkeit (1957) - (uncredited)
 ...und die Liebe lacht dazu (1957) - Luise Papendiek
 The Schimeck Family (1957) - Bernhardine, seine Frau
 Europas neue Musikparade 1958 (1957) - Tante Fita
 Ist Mama nicht fabelhaft? (1958) - Tante Emma
 Majestät auf Abwegen (1958) - Berta Linke
 Immer die Mädchen (1959) - Baronin Beate Siebenstein
 Liebe, Luft und lauter Lügen (1959) - Frau Lüsenhoop
 A Summer You Will Never Forget (1959) - Therese Leuchtenthal
 Ingeborg (1960) - Tante Ottilie
 The Time Has Come (1960, TV Series) - Barbara Barstow
 Bei Pichler stimmt die Kasse nicht (1961) - Ludmilla
 Love Has to Be Learned (1963) - Ilse Lehmbruck

References

External links

1901 births
1967 deaths
German film actresses
20th-century German actresses
Actors from Dortmund